Why Women Kill is an American dark comedy-drama anthology television series created by Marc Cherry, which depicts the events leading to deaths caused by women. The first season, which premiered on August 15, 2019, on CBS All Access, consists of 10 episodes and is set in multiple time periods. The second season, also containing 10 episodes, premiered on June 3, 2021 on Paramount+, and changes its focus to a single time period. In December 2021, the series was renewed for a third season. However, it was scrapped before production could begin in July 2022.

Plot
The first season of Why Women Kill follows three women from different decades who are connected through having all lived in the same Pasadena mansion and experiencing infidelity in their marriages. Beth Ann Stanton remains content as a housewife in 1963 until she learns of her husband Rob's unfaithfulness; socialite Simone Grove discovers her third husband Karl's homosexuality and begins her own affair with a younger man in 1984; and in 2019, bisexual attorney Taylor Harding finds her open marriage tested when she and her husband Eli become attracted to the same woman, Jade. The infidelity in each marriage sets off a chain of events that ends with a death caused by a woman.

Cast and characters

Season 1

1963
Main
 Ginnifer Goodwin as Beth Ann Stanton,  Rob's subservient wife.
 Hartlyn Hilsman as a young Beth Ann.
 Sam Jaeger as Rob Stanton, an aerospace engineer married to Beth Ann
 Sadie Calvano as April Warner, a waitress having an affair with Rob
Recurring
 Alicia Coppola as Sheila Mosconi, Rob and Beth Ann's neighbor and Leo's wife who befriends Beth Ann
 Adam Ferrara as Leo Mosconi, Rob and Beth Ann's neighbor and Sheila's husband
 Lindsey Kraft as Claire, Rob's secretary.
Guest
 Spencer Garrett as Hal Burke, Rob's boss
 Peri Gilpin as Vivian Burke, Hal's wife
 Lio Tipton as Mary Vlasin, Rob and Beth Ann's neighbor and Ralph's abused wife
 Scott Porter as Ralph Vlasin, Rob and Beth Ann's neighbor and Mary's abusive husband
 Ava Scarola as Emily Stanton, Rob and Beth Ann's deceased daughter
 Catherine Curry as Elsie Warner, April and Rob's daughter who is under the care of Beth Ann

1984
Main
 Lucy Liu as Simone Grove, a twice-divorced socialite married to Karl
 Harmonie He as a young Simone Grove
 Jack Davenport as Karl Grove, Simone's third husband who is using their relationship to conceal his homosexuality
Recurring
 Katie Finneran as Naomi Harte, a wealthy friend of Simone and Tommy's widowed mother
 Leo Howard as Tommy Harte, Naomi's son who harbors romantic feelings for Simone
 Li Jun Li as Amy Lin, Simone's daughter from her first marriage

Guest
 Charlie DePew as Brad Jenkins, Amy's fiancé
 Ken Garito as the police officer who mistakes Simone for a prostitute
 Christine Estabrook as Joyce Dubner, a hypochondriac neighbor of Simone
 Philip Anthony-Rodriguez as Hector, Simone's former hairdresser and Karl's lover
 Dale Dickey as Ruby Jenkins, Brad's mother
 Robert Craighead as Dwight Jenkins, Brad's father
 Hayley Hasselhoff as Patty Jenkins, Brad's lesbian sister

2019
Main
 Kirby Howell-Baptiste as Taylor Harding, a bisexual, feminist attorney in an open marriage with Eli
 Kendall Denise Clark as a young Taylor Harding
 Alexandra Daddario as Jade/Irene, the bisexual lover of Taylor, and then Eli
 Reid Scott as Eli Cohen, a screenwriter in an open marriage with Taylor

Recurring
 Kevin Daniels as Lamar, Eli's agent
Kevin McNamara as Duke, Jade's ex-boyfriend

Guest
 Saidha Arrika Ekulona as Taylor's sister
 Christina Anthony as Velma, Taylor's sister
 Odelya Halevi as Willow, an Instagram model working with Mischa and a friend of Jade
 Kevin William Paul as Mischa, Willow's fellow Instagram model, who is friends with Jade

Season 2

Main
 Allison Tolman as Alma Fillcot, a housewife in 1949 who is desperate to join the local exclusive garden club
 Rachel Redleaf as young Alma
 Lana Parrilla as Rita Castillo, the president of the local garden club and the gold-digging wife of Carlo
 B.K. Cannon as Dee Fillcot, Alma's daughter 
 Jordane Christie as Vern Loomis, a private investigator
 Matthew Daddario as Scooter, a struggling actor and Rita's paramour
 Veronica Falcón as Catherine Castillo, Rita's stepdaughter and Carlo's spinster daughter
 Nick Frost as Bertram Fillcot, Alma's husband and a veterinarian

Recurring
 Rachel Bay Jones as Maisie
 Daniel Zacapa as Carlo Castillo, Rita's elderly husband and Catherine's father
 Eileen Galindo as Isabel, Rita's maid who is secretly her accomplice and cousin
 Virginia Williams as Grace, a member of the garden club
 Rondi Reed as Mrs. Carol Yost, the Fillcot's grouchy, judgmental next door neighbor who expresses disbelief for Alma getting into the Elysian Park Garden Club
 Jessica Phillips as Joan, another member of the garden club 
 Kerry O'Malley as Mavis, another member of the garden club
 Cynthia Quiles as Brenda, another member of the garden club
 Jack Davenport as The Narrator
 Warren Kole as Detective Rohbin

Guest
 Ryan McPartlin as Tom Madison
 Andrew Leeds as Dr. Gibson

Episodes

Series overview

Season 1 (2019)

Season 2 (2021)

Production

Development
On September 24, 2018, it was announced that CBS All Access had given the production a straight-to-series order. The series was created by Marc Cherry who was also expected to executive produce alongside Brian Grazer, Francie Calfo, Michael Hanel, and Mindy Schultheis. Production companies involved with the series were slated to consist of Imagine Entertainment and CBS Television Studios. On December 10, 2018, it was reported that the series would receive $8.4 million in tax credits from the state of California.

Cherry stated at the 2019 Television Critics Association that there will be "three deaths at the end of the series, and they will all be committed by women. But it's not necessarily the three women on this stage. The victims are not necessarily the men on this stage, and interesting enough, not one person will be killed because of infidelity. Infidelity is just the starting point for these journeys of self‑discovery."

On October 16, 2019, the day before the season 1 finale, it was announced that the series was renewed for a second season that would focus on a new set of characters. Julie McNamara, CBS All Access' EVP of Original Content, stated that, "Under the creative direction of Marc Cherry and the incredible performances of the cast, the series has become one of our most streamed original series. We look forward to bringing fans even more of this wonderfully soapy dramedy in its second season and can't wait to see what themes Marc explores next."

On November 11, 2020, it was reported that the second season had been suspended production after positive COVID-19 tests of production team members. On December 15, 2021, Paramount+ renewed the series for a third season. On July 1, 2022, the season was reported scrapped just before production was set to begin.

Casting
In February 2019, it was announced that Ginnifer Goodwin and Lucy Liu had been cast in starring roles. On February 27, 2019, it was reported that Reid Scott had joined the cast. On March 4, 2019, it was announced that Sam Jaeger had joined the cast. On March 7, 2019, it was announced that Alexandra Daddario had joined the cast. On March 11, 2019, Kirby Howell-Baptiste had been cast. On March 19, 2019, Sadie Calvano joined cast as a series regular. On April 5, 2019, Katie Finneran has been cast in a recurring role. On April 17, 2019, Adam Ferrara joined the cast in a recurring capacity. On August 7, 2019, Li Jun Li was cast in a recurring role. In October 2020, Allison Tolman, Nick Frost, Lana Parrilla, B.K. Cannon, Jordane Christie, Matthew Daddario, Veronica Falcón were cast to star for the second season. In November 2020, Virginia Williams, Jessica Phillips, Eileen Galindo, Cynthia Quiles, and Kerry O'Malley joined the cast in recurring roles for the second season. On April 14, 2021, Rachel Bay Jones was cast in a recurring role for the second season.

Release
Why Women Kill premiered on August 15, 2019, and its first season consisted of 10 episodes on CBS All Access. The second season premiered on June 3, 2021, on Paramount+ and it consists of 10 episodes.

Why Women Kill: Truth, Lies and Labels

On September 20, 2019, CBS All Access released the first episode of a six episode podcast, entitled Why Women Kill: Truth, Lies and Labels, to help advertise for Why Women Kill. The final episode was released on October 25. Each episode, released weekly on Friday, shares the details of a woman who became a murderer. The podcast is available on Apple Podcasts, Google Podcasts, Spotify, and Stitcher Radio. Tori Telfer, a true crime writer, narrates each episode.

Reception

On review aggregator Rotten Tomatoes, the first season holds an approval rating of 67% based on 27 reviews, with an average rating of 7.6/10. The website's critical consensus reads, "Though Why Women Kill falls short of its ambitious premise, fans of Marc Cherry and his impressive cast will find much to like in its darkly soapy and stylish delights." On Metacritic, it has a weighted average score of 63 out of 100, based on 16 critics, indicating "generally favorable reviews".

While the aesthetic of the series received praise, critics found that Why Women Kill lacked character development. Robyn Bahr of The Hollywood Reporter wrote, "We're supposed to marvel at the changing roles of women over time, but it's hard to get there, intellectually, when none of the three leads feels like a semblance of a real person. Instead, Why Women Kill comes off as an ungainly fantasy of women's emotional lives, where the threat of infidelity could be the only fuel of marital unhappiness." Vulture reviewer Angelica Jade Bastién agreed with the focus on aesthetics more than plot, stating, "Why Women Kill is akin to an overly complicated craft cocktail, boasting an intriguing brightness, namely in the form of Goodwin's performance, but lacking balance in its competing flavors. It's full of baffling tonal and narrative decisions that undermine what does work about the show—a handful of the performances, the over-the-top, nearly camp production design, the costuming—and undercuts its dramatic potential with broad, nearly slapstick humor that distances us from the characters rather than illuminating who they are."

However, Greg Wheeler of 'The Review Geek' changed his view as the series progressed, and gave this favourable summary: 'Why Women Kill is one of those shows that's hurt by early reviews. I've said it many times before that a full season review rating should be reserved for just that – a full season. When it comes to this wonderful drama, this is a perfect example against judging a show by the first few episodes. What began as an artistic trio of stories dancing around a singular idea, quickly blossomed into one of the best shows of the year. Between the strong writing and well paced segments, right across to the different themes and ideas explored each episode, Why Women Kill may just be one of my favourite shows of the year, balancing the artistic juxtapositions and smart editing with the perfect finale to balance things out.'

On Rotten Tomatoes, the second season has an approval rating of 83% based on 6 reviews, with an average rating of 7.33/10.

Notes

References

External links
 
 

2010s American anthology television series
2010s American black comedy television series
2010s American comedy-drama television series
2010s American LGBT-related comedy television series
2010s American LGBT-related drama television series
2020s American anthology television series
2020s American black comedy television series
2020s American comedy-drama television series
2020s American LGBT-related comedy television series
2020s American LGBT-related drama television series
2019 American television series debuts
2021 American television series endings
Adultery in television
Bisexuality-related television series
English-language television shows
Murder in television
Paramount+ original programming
Polyamory in fiction
Television series by CBS Studios
Television series by Imagine Entertainment
Television series set in the 1940s
Television series set in 1963
Television series set in 1984
Television series set in 2019
Television shows set in Los Angeles
Television shows set in Pasadena, California